The Timing closure in VLSI design and electronics engineering is the process by which a logic design of a clocked synchronous circuit consisting of primitive elements such as combinatorial logic gates (AND, OR, NOT, NAND, NOR, etc.) and sequential logic gates (flip flops, latches, memories) is modified to meet its timing requirements. Unlike in a computer program where there is no explicit delay to perform a calculation, logic circuits have intrinsic and well defined delays to propagate inputs to outputs.

Overview 
In simple cases, the user can compute the path delay between elements manually. If the design is more than a dozen or so elements this is impractical. For example, the time delay along a path from the output of a D-Flip Flop, through combinatorial logic gates, then into the next D-Flip Flop input must satisfy (be less than) the time period between synchronizing clock pulses to the two flip flops. When the delay through the elements is greater than the clock cycle time, the elements are said to be on the critical path. The circuit will not function when the path delay exceeds the clock cycle delay so modifying the circuit to remove the timing failure (and eliminate the critical path) is an important part of the logic design engineer's task. Critical path also defines the maximum delay in all the multiple register-to-register paths, and it need not be greater than the clock cycle time. After meeting the timing closure, one of the method to improve the circuit performance is to insert a register in between the combinational path of the critical path. This might improve the performance but increases the total latency (maximum number of registers from input to output path) of the circuit.  

Many times logic circuit changes are handled by user's EDA tools based on timing constraint directives prepared by a designer. The term is also used for the goal that is achieved, when such a design has reached the end of the flow and its timing requirements are satisfied.

The main steps of the design flow, which may be involved in this process, are logic synthesis, placement, clock-tree synthesis and routing. A single reference clock is often cascaded and synthesized into many different output blocks of clocks resulting into a tree structure.

With present technologies all of them need to be timing-aware for a design to properly meet its timing requirements, but with technologies in the range of the micrometre only logic synthesis EDA tools had such a prerequisite.

Design automation tools 
Nevertheless, even if timing-awareness was extended to all these steps starting from well-established principles used for logic synthesis, the two phases, logic and physical, of the timing closure process are conventionally handled by different design teams and different EDA tools. Design Compiler by Synopsys, Encounter RTL Compiler by Cadence Design Systems and BlastCreate by Magma Design Automation are examples of logic synthesis tools. IC Compiler by Synopsys, SoC Encounter by Cadence Design Systems and Blast Fusion by Magma Design Automation are examples of tools capable of timing-aware placement, clock tree synthesis and routing and therefore used for physical timing closure.

When the user requires the circuit to meet exceptionally difficult timing constraints, it may be necessary to utilize machine learning programs, such as InTime by Plunify, to find an optimum set of FPGA synthesis, map, place and route tool configuration parameters that ensures the circuit will close timing. 

A timing requirement needs to be translated into a static timing constraint for an EDA tool to be able to handle it.

See also 
Design closure
Electronic design automation
Design flow (EDA)
Integrated circuit design
Physical timing closure
Static timing analysis
Asynchronous circuit

Notes

References 
Phy-TC.Com. This article is derived from the document Timing closure by Alessandro Uber.

Timing in electronic circuits